The Epworth United Methodist Church is a United Methodist church in the Edgewater neighborhood of Chicago, Illinois. It was built in the Romanesque style and is noted for its exterior walls of brown, rusticated boulders. The church was completed in 1891, becoming the second church in Edgewater after the completion of the Episcopal Church of the Atonement in 1889. The structure was enlarged in 1930, and was added to the National Register of Historic Places in 2008. The final service at the church was on May 15, 2022.

History

John Lewis Cochran, the founder of Edgewater, donated land for the church in 1886. The church was the only structure at the location; it is now in a dense residential neighborhood with its façade facing Kenmore Avenue. The church was formally organized as the Epworth Methodist Episcopal Church in July 1889, and a cornerstone for the church was dedicated in 1890. The church was designed by Frederick B. Townsend, a parishioner, and completed in the early 1890s. Parts of the church were constructed using boulders from Wisconsin, which were floated south down Lake Michigan.

Names

Epworth Methodist Episcopal Church (1889-1948)
Epworth Methodist Church (1948-1968)
Epworth United Methodist Church (1968–present)

Structure

The original church structure consisted of a three towers, a sanctuary, and school rooms. The church was enlarged in 1930 to include a basement, gymnasium, chapel, and miscellaneous rooms.

Heritage designation

The church was added to the National Register of Historic Places under the name "Epworth Methodist Episcopal Church" in 2008.  The listing included one contributing building and one contributing object.

References

External links
Church website

Churches in Chicago
Properties of religious function on the National Register of Historic Places in Chicago
Churches completed in 1890
Romanesque Revival church buildings in Illinois
1890 establishments in Illinois
Churches on the National Register of Historic Places in Illinois